Bryan Herbert Valentine  (17 January 1908 – 2 February 1983) was an English cricketer who played in seven Test matches between 1933 and 1939. He was born at Blackheath, London and died at Otford, Kent.

Although he played only seven Tests, his Test batting average of 64.85, including two centuries and one fifty, is twice his overall first-class cricket record of 30.15 with 35 centuries and 90 fifties in 399 first-class matches. He played in just two Test series, scoring 179 runs in two tests against India on the 1933/34 tour with a best of 136 in less than 3 hours on debut in Bombay.  He amassed 275 runs in 5 matches against South Africa on the 1938/39 MCC tour, including a score of 112 in 2 hours, 40 minutes in Cape Town in the Second Test of the series. His final Test was the famous 'timeless test' in Durban which saw England's last innings cut short at 654/5 when they were forced to catch the boat home after 10 days of cricket.   Valentine ended the match on 4 not out.

Valentine was educated at Repton School and Pembroke College, Cambridge. He represented Cambridge University at cricket in 1928 and 1929, and also won a Blue for soccer. His long career at Kent County Cricket Club as a right-handed batsman and occasional medium pacer spanned two decades from 1927 to 1948.  He was awarded his Kent cap in 1931 and captained the county on occasion during the 1930s in the absence of Percy Chapman; in 1937 he shared the captaincy with Ronnie Bryan.  Following Gerry Chalk's death in World War II Valentine captained Kent again between 1946 and 1948 before being succeeded by David Clark.

An attacking batsman whose defence improved with experience in the first-class arena, he was particularly strong through the leg side but his Test appearances were limited by the strength of the England team at the time.  His highest score, 242, was made for Kent against Leicestershire at Oakham in 1938.   A limited bowler, he was an excellent all round fielder equally at home in the covers or catching close to the wicket.

During World War II Valentine served with the Royal West Kent Regiment and was awarded the Military Cross "in recognition of gallant and distinguished services in North Africa". He returned to cricket despite being badly wounded during hostilities.  He was President of Kent County Cricket Club in 1967 and served on the cricket committee for many years.

His sister, Carol, also played test cricket for England women's cricket team.

References

External links

Bryan Herbert Valentine (obituary), Kent Cricket

1908 births
1983 deaths
England Test cricketers
Cricketers who made a century on Test debut
Kent cricket captains
Kent cricketers
Free Foresters cricketers
Marylebone Cricket Club cricketers
Cambridge University cricketers
Gentlemen cricketers
People educated at Repton School
Alumni of Pembroke College, Cambridge
North v South cricketers
Gentlemen of England cricketers
Queen's Own Royal West Kent Regiment officers
British Army personnel of World War II
Military personnel from Kent
Recipients of the Military Cross
English cricketers of 1919 to 1945
L. H. Tennyson's XI cricket team